Leon Hudson Andrews (August 9, 1883 – May 29, 1949) was an American football player and coach. He played college football at Yale University, lettering in 1903 and 1905.  Andrews served as the head football coach at Grinnell College in Grinnell, Iowa in 1908, compiling a record of 5–4, and was an assistant coach at Texas A&M University in 1910.

Head coaching record

References

1883 births
1949 deaths
Grinnell Pioneers football coaches
Texas A&M Aggies football coaches
Yale Bulldogs football players
Sportspeople from Hartford, Connecticut
Players of American football from Hartford, Connecticut